Las Mercedes may refer to:

 Las Mercedes (archaeological site, Costa Rica)
 Las Mercedes (Asunción), Paraguay, a neighborhood
 Las Mercedes, Caracas, Venezuela, a shopping district
 Las Mercedes Municipality, Guárico, Venezuela